Minuscule 347 (in the Gregory-Aland numbering), ε 226 (Soden), is a Greek minuscule manuscript of the New Testament, on parchment. Paleographically it has been assigned to the 12th century. It has full marginalia.

Description 

The codex contains a complete text of the four Gospels on 245 parchment leaves with only one lacuna (Matthew 1:1-10). The text is written in one column per page, in 25 lines per page.

There is also a division according to the Ammonian Sections (in Mark 233 Sections - 16:8), with references to the Eusebian Canons (written below Ammonian Section numbers).

Text 

The Greek text of the codex is a representative of the Byzantine text-type. Hermann von Soden classified it to the textual family Kx. Aland placed it in Category V.

According to the Claremont Profile Method it represents textual family Kx in Luke 1 and Luke 20. In Luke 10 no profile was made.

The text of the Pericope Adulterae (John 7:53-8:11) is placed after John 21:25.

History 

The manuscript was written by Constantin Chrysographus. It was examined by Scholz and Burgon. It was added to the list of New Testament manuscripts by Scholz (1794-1852).
C. R. Gregory saw it in 1886.

The manuscript is currently housed at the Biblioteca Ambrosiana (R. 35 sup.) in Milan.

See also 

 List of New Testament minuscules
 Biblical manuscript
 Textual criticism

References

Further reading 

 J. M. A. Scholz, Biblisch-kritische Reise (Leipzig, 1823), p. 70-73.

Greek New Testament minuscules
12th-century biblical manuscripts
Manuscripts of the Ambrosiana collections